Charlton-Pollard High School was a segregated high school for black students, operated by the Beaumont Independent School District. The school colors were blue and white, and the mascot was the bulldog. It was located in the South End area, in proximity to an oil refinery.

History
Named after two people, it opened in 1900. Its main athletic rival was Hebert High School. Carol T. Taylor Mitchell, who once taught as a science teacher at the school circa 1970, described its facilities as inferior to those of the mostly white Austin Junior High School.

Charlton-Pollard consolidated with Beaumont High School to form Beaumont Charlton-Pollard High School in 1975. The merger happened since Joe J. Fisher, a U.S. district judge, asked Beaumont ISD to speedily desegregate.

The Charlton-Pollard High School Alumni Association exists.  Bettye Duplantier, of the class of 1963, is the president of the association.

References

External links
 Charlton-Pollard High School Alumni Association

1975 disestablishments in Texas
Educational institutions disestablished in 1975
Beaumont Independent School District high schools